Joe Grima (born 18 September 1960) is a New Zealand former professional rugby league footballer who played for Swinton, Widnes and the Keighley Cougars.

Playing career

Swinton
Grima was signed by Swinton in October 1985. In 1987, he helped the team win promotion from the Second Division, and also played in the inaugural Second Division Premiership final, scoring a try in a 27–10 win against Hunslet.

Widnes
Grima spent four years at Widnes, and was part of the squad that won the 1989 World Club Challenge against the Canberra Raiders.

Grima played right- in Widnes' 6–12 defeat by Wigan in the 1988–89 John Player Special Trophy Final during the 1988–89 season at Burnden Park, Bolton on Saturday 7 January 1989, and was an interchange/substitute, i.e. number 15, in the 24–0 victory over Leeds in the 1991–92 Regal Trophy Final during the 1991–92 season at Central Park, Wigan on Saturday 11 January 1992.

Personal life
After retiring, Grima lived in Skipton, North Yorkshire, before later returning to his native New Zealand.

References

External links
 Profile at rugby.widnes.tv

1960 births
Living people
New Zealand rugby league players
Rugby league props
Swinton Lions players
Widnes Vikings players
Keighley Cougars players
New Zealand expatriate sportspeople in England